The Bughea is a right tributary of the river Teleajen in Romania. It flows into the Teleajen near Gura Vitioarei.

References

Rivers of Romania
Rivers of Prahova County